Beck – Pojken i glaskulan (Beck - The boy in the glass ball) is a 2002 film about the Swedish police detective Martin Beck directed by Daniel Lind Lagerlöf.

Cast 
 Peter Haber as Martin Beck
 Mikael Persbrandt as Gunvald Larsson
 Malin Birgerson as Alice Levander
 Marie Göranzon as Margareta Oberg
 Hanns Zischler as Josef Hillman
 Ingvar Hirdwall as Martin Beck's neighbour
 Rebecka Hemse as Inger (Martin Beck's daughter)
 Jimmy Endeley as Robban
 Mårten Klingberg as Nick
 Peter Hüttner as Oljelund
 Anders Nyström as Waltberg
 Lena Carlsson as Lisa Norling
 Ulf Friberg as Kaj Gerstedt
 Anders Palm as Bernt Jansson
 Leo Hallerstam as Jack Svensson
 Per Svensson as Stefan Svensson

References

External links 

Martin Beck films
2002 television films
2002 films
2000s crime films
Films directed by Daniel Lind Lagerlöf
2000s police procedural films
2000s Swedish-language films
2000s Swedish films